is a Japanese comedian and television presenter. He performs tsukkomi in the comedy duo Football Hour with his partner Nozomu Iwao. Gotō is represented by Yoshimoto Kogyo and is mainly active in Tokyo and Osaka.

Life and career 

Gotō dropped out of university prep school in order to pursue comedy at Yoshimoto NSC Osaka, graduating in the 14th generation class. He formed the unit Gotō-Tenma with Kunio Tenma in 1994, as they were from the same class. The duo then changed their name to Electronic Gram and was active until 1999, when they disbanded. Gotō played the boke at the time. Immediately after the disbandment, Gotō partnered up with his friend who is also from Yoshimoto NSC Osaka's 14th generation class, Nozomu Iwao, to form Football Hour, he also transitioned to becoming the tsukkomi while Iwao plays the boke.

Gotō married in August 2013. His wife gave birth to a boy in June 2015.

Media
This list comprises appearances by Terumoto Gotō only, for appearances as Football Hour along with his partner Nozomu Iwao, see Football Hour.

Television

Current programs

Regular
  (Nippon TV) (2012–Present) MC - Alongside Yoshimi Tokui, Rino Sashihara, and Shelly
  (Nippon TV) (2011–Present) MC - Interchanges with Koji Higashino and Hiroyuki Miyasako
  (Nippon TV) (2015–Present) MC - Alongside Hiromi

Semi-regular
  (TV Asahi)
  (TV Asahi)
  (Fuji TV)
  (TV Tokyo)
  (Nippon TV)
  (TBS TV)

Web series
  (Amazon Prime Video) (2017) - Season 3
  (Amazon Prime Video) (2019) - Season 7

References

External links 
 Official Profile on Yoshimoto Kogyo

Japanese comedians
Japanese television personalities
Japanese television presenters
People from Osaka
1974 births
Living people